Arthur Whitfield  (1868–1947) was an English physician, professor of medicine, and pioneer of dermatology.

Biography
After education at King's College School, Arthur Whitfield began his study medicine in 1887 at King's College Hospital and qualified from there LRCP MRCS in 1891 and graduated MB (Lond.) in 1892. He held successively several house appointments, including the Sambrooke Medical Registrarship, at King's College Hospital. In 1893 he qualified MRCP and graduated MD. From 1893 to 1896 he pursued postgraduate study at clinics in Vienna and Berlin. He was appointed in 1896 assistant physician to the West London Hospital and then at the Royal Northern Hospital. At King's College Hospital he was appointed in 1896 assistant physician, with charge of the skin department, and in 1906 full physician and professor of dermatology. There he was also dean of the medical school from 1904 to 1905, and during WWI he was a general physician in charge of outpatients. Whitfield held additional appointments as professor of dermatology at the Royal Army Medical College and dermatologist to St Dustan's.

Whitfield's A Handbook of Skin Diseases and their Treatment (1907) had a revised second edition in 1921. A third edition was completed by Edmund Harold Molesworth, his Australian ex-pupil. Whitfield contributed articles on skin diseases to Encyclopædia Medica and to Allbutt's A System of Medicine, as well as numerous papers on skin diseases to medical journals.

Whitfield was elected FRCP in 1905. He was the Lumleian Lecturer in 1921. He was president of the British Association of Dermatologists in 1926–1927. He was elected a corresponding member of the Société Française de Dermatologie.

The original formula for Whitfield's ointment consists of benzoic acid — 25 grains (1.6 gram) (5%); salicylic acid — 15 grains (1 gram) (3%); soft paraffin — (128 minims) (7.1 millilitres) (25%); coconut oil — to 10 fluid ounces (28 millilitres).

He was an important pioneer of dermatology among the group of British physicians who followed Henry Radcliffe Crocker, William Tilbury Fox, and Thomas Colcott Fox.

Selected publication

References 

1868 births
1947 deaths
19th-century English medical doctors
20th-century English medical doctors
British dermatologists
English dermatologists
People educated at King's College School, London
Fellows of the Royal College of Physicians